Euro gold and silver commemorative coins are special euro coins minted and issued by member states of the Eurozone, mainly in gold and silver, although other precious metals are also used in rare occasions. Estonia joined the Eurozone on 1. January 2011. Since then Bank of Estonia has been issuing both normal issues of Estonian euro coins, which are intended for circulation, and commemorative euro coins in gold and silver.

Summary 
As of January 2011 there has been one commemorative coin set released.

The following table shows the number of coins minted per year. In the first section, the coins are grouped by the metal used, while in the second section they are grouped by their face value.

2011 coinage

Bank of Estonia issued a set of both 2011 coins with matching serial numbers in a wooden box with issue price of €440.

See also

 Commemorative coins of Estonia

References

Sources
 

Estonia
Currencies of Estonia